Dangi (Marathi:डांगी) is an indigenous cattle breed of India. It originated in the hilly tracts of Dangs comprising the Nasik and Ahmednagar districts in the  state of Maharashtra. The breed is medium to large in body size. They are a very good draught breed and known for their adaptability to heavy rainfall areas. The skin of this breed secretes an oil element that enables them to tolerate heavy rains.

See also
List of breeds of cattle

References

External links
Exhibition To Boost Dangi Cattle Breed - Video

Cattle breeds originating in India
Cattle breeds
Nashik district
Animal husbandry in Maharashtra